The Lac qui Parle River is a tributary of the Minnesota River,  long, in southwestern Minnesota in the United States. A number of tributaries of the river, including its largest, the West Branch Lac qui Parle River, also flow in eastern South Dakota. Slightly more than two-thirds of the Lac qui Parle watershed is in Minnesota. Lac qui parle means "lake which speaks" in the French language, and was a translation of the Sioux name for Lac qui Parle, a lake on the Minnesota River upstream of the mouth of the Lac qui Parle River.

The source of the river is Lake Hendricks on the boundary of Lincoln County, Minnesota, and Brookings County, South Dakota. Continuing northeastwardly through flat till plains with occasional willows and cottonwoods along its banks, the river flows into eastern Lac qui Parle County, passing to the east of Dawson. Lac qui Parle Lake was formed by a delta at the mouth of the Lac qui Parle River, and is maintained by a dam.

Flow rate
At the United States Geological Survey's stream gauge near the community of Lac qui Parle in Lac qui Parle Township, the annual mean flow of the river between 1910 and 2005 was 157 cubic feet per second (4 m³/s). The highest recorded flow during the period was 17,100 ft³/s (484 m³/s) on April 10, 1969. Readings of zero were recorded on numerous days during several years.

See also
List of rivers of Minnesota
List of rivers of South Dakota

External links
Public Water Access: Lac qui Parle & Yellow Medicine Counties
USGS current stream gauge conditions for Lac qui Parle River near Lac qui Parle

References

Rivers of Minnesota
Rivers of South Dakota
Tributaries of the Minnesota River
Rivers of Deuel County, South Dakota
Rivers of Lac qui Parle County, Minnesota
Rivers of Lincoln County, Minnesota
Rivers of Yellow Medicine County, Minnesota